General elections were held in Burma to vote for 202 out of 250 seats to the Burmese Chamber of Deputies; the remaining 48 members (all from the Anti-Fascist People's Freedom League, AFPFL) were elected unopposed as no opposition candidates stood against them.

The AFPFL, a former wartime resistance organisation, won the elections with a reduced majority. After the election, U Nu, leader of the AFPFL, temporarily retired to reform the party and its policies.

The second part of the election to elect members to the Chamber of Nationalities took place on 22 May after the election commission stated that "rebel intimidation and the lack of security prevented the people from exercising freedom of choice". Voter turnout was 47.8%.

Campaign
The AFPFL, National United Front (NUF) and smaller parties participated in the election. The NUF was successful in gaining media attention and organising trade union and peasant organisations. However, the AFPFL was concerned at alleged funding by foreign embassies of the NUF. A number of smaller parties represented different ethnic groups and were more local than national. Meanwhile, U Nu of the AFPFL advocated his long held policy of neutrality.

Conduct
After identifying themselves and voting, voters would dip their forefinger in green indelible ink. Opposition parties complained of minor irregularities regarding election lists. Due to the security situation, the army was told to ensure free and fair elections but not to intimidate voters. Students in the capital Rangoon had threatened to cause disorder after one of their leaders was killed by police, however this did not materialise.

Results

References

Elections in Myanmar
1956 in Burma
Burma
Election and referendum articles with incomplete results